Lake Stay is a lake in Lincoln County, in the U.S. state of Minnesota.

Lake Stay was named for Frank Stay, a soldier in the Dakota War of 1862.

See also
List of lakes in Minnesota

References

Lakes of Minnesota
Lakes of Lincoln County, Minnesota